The Military Bishopric of Hungary is a military ordinariate of the Roman Catholic Church. Immediately subject to the Holy See, it provides pastoral care to Roman Catholics serving in the Hungarian Home Defence Force and their families.

History
The first military bishop was appointed on 23 March 1920, but after the first bishop resigned in 1926 the post fell into abeyance. Nearly seventy years later, a military ordinariate for Hungary was established by Pope John Paul II on 18 April 1994.

Office holders

Military bishops
 István Zadravecz, O.F.M. (appointed 23 March 1920 – resigned 1926)

Military ordinaries
 Gáspár Ladocsi (appointed 18 April 1994 – appointed Auxiliary Bishop of Esztergom-Budapest 28 November 2001)
 Tamás Szabó (appointed 28 November 2001 – resigned 15 March 2007)
 László Bíró (appointed 20 November 2008 – resigned 18 February 2021)
 Tibor Berta (appointed 18 February 2021 – present)

References

 Katolikus Tábori Püspökség - Katonai Ordinariátus (Hungarian)
 Military Ordinariate of Hungary (Catholic-Hierarchy)
 Tábori Püspökség (Hungary) (GCatholic.org)

Hungary
Hungary
Military of Hungary
Military units and formations established in 1994
Christian organizations established in 1994